John Adams (July 14, 1773 – June 23, 1825) was an American physician who served as mayor of Richmond, Virginia from 1819 to 1825.

Life and public service
John Adams, the tenth child of Richard and Elizabeth Adams, was born 14 July 1773. He graduated in medicine from the University of Edinburgh in 1796. Although he practiced medicine in Richmond all his life, Adams was also very active in business and politics.  A member of the Virginia House of Delegates in 1803-04, he served as mayor of Richmond from 1819 until his death in 1825.

Adams began his medical practice in Richmond as the partner of Dr. Cringan, and later became a partner with Dr. Micajah Clarke - in both instances advertising services in the local newspapers.

Regarding John Adams' work in Richmond, a 19th century account states:

"No man possessed greater influence or wielded more energetic authority....He secured an extremely efficient police, and became the terror of evil-doers in the mayor's court.  He undertook the thorough grading of the streets, leveling hills, filling up valleys, and giving it the appearance of a live city.  He gave an impetus to the docks… and commenced those wonderful improvements in its buildings in all the eastern portion of the city....He was the proprietor and builder of the Union Hotel, and many of the largest warehouses and manufacturies, and inaugurated lines of stages to every part of the State.  Few men ever exhibited, for his means and opportunities, more enlarged views and greater enterprise."
An event said to be the greatest civic and social affair in Richmond history occurred in 1825, when General Lafayette returned to Virginia, 43 years after his first visit.  Mayor John Adams gave the welcoming address on Lafayette's arrival - saluting the hero as a "fellow citizen of Virginia and a brother by adoption."  Parades, fireworks and festivities followed, culminating in a dinner - reportedly the greatest ever given in Richmond - which continued until 11 pm.
Notable, for the 1823 era, was Mayor Adams' endorsement of a petition by 91 free persons of colour and slaves to form a Baptist church, where they might worship together and take instruction in letters.  The petition states:The petition of a number of persons of colour residing in the City of Richmond, respectfully represents: that from the rapid increase of population in the City, the number of free persons of colour and slaves has become very considerable and although few of them can boast any knowledge of letters, yet that they are always desirous of receiving such instruction from public and divine worship as may be given by sensible and prudent Teachers of religion.
It has been the misfortune of your petitioners to be excluded from the churches, meeting-houses and other places of public devotion which are used by white persons in consequence of no appropriate places being assigned for them, except in a few Houses, and they have been compelled to look to private Houses, where they are much crowded and where a portion of their Brothers are unable to hear or to partake of the worship which is going on.  Your Petitioners consisting of free persons and slaves, have been for some time associated with the Baptist church.  A list of their members consisting of about 700 persons has been submitted for his inspection to the Head of Police of this City and no objection has been by him made to their moral characters.

Your Petitioners for these reasons humbly pray that your honourable body will pass a law authorizing them to cause to be erected within this city a house of public worship which may be called the Baptist African Church.  To such restrictions and restraints as are consistent with the laws now existing or which may hereafter be passed for the proper restraint of persons of colour and for the preservation of the peace and good order of society ... our petitioners are prepared most cheerfully to submit, and although it would be pleasing to them to have a voice in the choice of their Teachers yet would they be quite satisfied that any choice made by them should be approved or rejected by the Mayor of this city, they ask not for the privilege of continuing in office any preacher who shall in any manner have rendered himself obnoxious to the Mayor, nor can they reasonably expect to hold night meetings of assemblages for Baptizing but with the consent of that office.  And your Petitioners as in duty bound will ever pray...Adams endorsed the petition:I am of opinion that the prayers of their petition, if granted, may be productive of benefit to themselves as well as to the white population of Richmond and most sincerely wish them success.
John Adams

Mayor of the City of RichmondThe petitioned-for Baptist institution was launched and served until 1831.  At that time, six years after Adams' death, the city fathers rescinded the earlier permission - fearful that teaching literacy would help spread the abolitionist movement.  An Act of April 7, 1831, stated "all meetings of free negroes or mulattoes at any school-house or other place for teaching them reading or writing , either in the day or night, under whatever pretext" were declared to be unlawful assemblies.  (A still stricter law banning assemblies of negroes for black-led religious worship was enacted in 1842.)
When Dr. John Adams died, the following obituary appeared in the Richmond Enquirer of 28 June 1825:
We have the melancholy office of announcing the death of Dr. John Adams, the Mayor of this city.  This respectable gentleman breathed his last on Friday morning.  He was a native of Richmond, where he has continued to reside, except during the period when he was attending the Medical Lectures at the University of Edinburgh.  He returned excellently qualified for a Physician, and continued to practice till the day of his death. Dr. A. has remained the Mayor of this city from the moment of the present organization of the municipal authority - in which capacity he displayed a zeal that never tired and a qualification that rarely failed.  He was attended to the grave by a large body of citizens, and with all the honors which the municipal authorities of the town and the society of Free Masons could confer.  He has left a large family to bemoan his loss.

At the time of his death, on June 23 or 24, 1825, John Adams was the longest-serving mayor in Richmond’s history.

Homes, burial and children
In 1802 John Adams built a house at 2311 East Grace Street on Church Hill, on property his father Richard had given him.  In 1822 Adams lost both his home and hotel due to bad loans made to others. The house was eventually acquired by John Van Lew (Liew).  During the Civil War, Van Lew's daughter Elizabeth Van Lew gained notoriety as a Yankee abolitionist and Union sympathizer and as a reputed Yankee spy. She was alleged to have concealed escaped prisoners in a secret chamber under the roof of the mansion.  After Grant was elected President, he appointed Miss Van Lew postmistress of Richmond - possibly in respect for her services during the war.  She continued a crusade, this time for women's suffrage; but she was completely ostracized socially. The Adams/Van Lew house was razed in 1911 and replaced by a public school that still stands (Bellevue Elementary School).

Dr. Adams built a brick double house between 1809 and 1810 for rental purposes, at the southeast corner of Grace and 25th streets (2501 East Grace St).  It is a double house of two and a half stories with peaked roof and a chimney made to serve both parts of the building.  Another Adams house still remaining on Grace St is the home built by Dr. Adams for his sister Ann, who married Mayo Carrington.  It was restored by the Association for the Preservation of Virginia Antiquities.

Dr. John Adams married Margaret Winston, daughter of Geddes Winston and Mary Jordan, in January, 1799.

The children of Dr. John and Margaret Adams were Mary Griffin, who married Dr. John Minge; Eliza, who married Capt. John Heron of the U.S. Navy; Martha Winston, who married Burwell B. Moseley of Norfolk; Margaret, who married first Charles Pickett, and second married her cousin Col. George Mayo Carrington; Louisa, who also married her cousin Dr. Richard Adams Carrington; Elvira, married David Minge, a brother of Dr. John Minge; John, who married twice but had no children; Richard Henry, who married Anna Carter Harrison (sister of Mary Howell Harrison, who married Col. George William Hunt Minge, brother of David and Dr. John Minge); and Lavinia, who probably died in infancy.  Thus, it will be seen that two sisters (Mary Griffin Adams and Elvira Adams) married two brothers (Dr. John Minge and David Minge).  In addition, an Adams brother (Richard Henry) had a Minge brother-in-law.

Adams family members were buried in a family burying ground on Marshall St. near 23rd on Church Hill. This was the last cemetery remaining in the heart of town, and town eventually intruded.  In 1892 the cemetery was closed to make way for redevelopment, and the bodies were moved to Hollywood Cemetery.  There is a large memorial with an inscription on one side that reads "In memory of Col. Richard Adams" and displays the coat of arms of the Adams family.  On the other side of the monument is the inscription:

"In memoriam Col, Richd Adams (wife Elizabeth Griffin) and 2 childn who died 23rd Dec. 1800 by his will devised all his property in this city to his son Col. Richd Adams Jr. (He survived his 2 wives and 6 childn) who died 9th Jan 1817, by his will devised all his property to brothers sisters nephews and nieces in which he directed, that the old Adams cemetery at N.E. cor 23rd & Marshall Streets this city, be enlarged to 1/2 acre. Their remains with those of Dr. Jno Adams & wife Margaret, S.G. Adams and wife Catherine, Col. Geo. M. Carrington wife Margaret 4 infants & Chas G. Pickett (her 1st husband) and their child, Dr. Richard A Carrington wife Louisa, 8 childn & 4 grchildn Dr Jno Minge wife Marg’t G. & 1 dr Miss Tabitha & Elizabeth G. Adams, Mrs. Jno Heron & l child, Wm Marshall wife Alice & 6 childn, R.H. Adams wife son & dr, Littleberry Carrington 1 dr & 4 grchildn Wm B. Randolph of Chatsworth son of Mrs Richd Adams Jr & many others unknown were removed from the 'old cemetery' to this section with all monuments head and foot stone in compliance with an order from the Ch'y CT of City Richd in suit of 'P.R. Carrington & wife vs. Adams heirs’ and interred beneath this monument Oct. 1892." 

Most of the members of the Adams family remained in Virginia, but two migrated to Marengo County, Alabama.  Elvira Adams, born in Richmond 25 September 1814, married David Minge of Charles City, Virginia on 5 October 1837 and came to Alabama soon after.  Elvira's brother Richard Henry Adams and his wife Anna Carter Harrison had already made the move - probably between 1832 and 1835. Richard and Anna established the Altwood plantation and were successful cotton planters. Having purchased land in Dallas County, Alabama, he removed to Selma and became a merchant for a while. Later he returned to Virginia and engaged in farming. His 1870 will mentions large acreages in Marengo and Perry County, Alabama, and in Montgomery County, Virginia. In addition he held railroad shares in Alabama and shares in a lime kiln business in Shelby County.

The children of Richard Henry and Anna Adams continued to live in Alabama. The house Altwood, one of Alabama's few Virginia Tidewater-type cottages outside the Tennessee Valley, is unusual in that it evolved from a dogtrot house.  Through the Alabama Historic Commission's Endangered Landmarks Program the house was acquired in 1987 by Dr. and Mrs. Jim Rankin, moved a few miles, and restored.

Ancestry

John Adams’ great-grandfather was Richard Adams of Abridge, County Essex, England. He is said to have been a "citizen and merchant-tailor of London" when he executed a deed of trust on 23 September 1718 for the use of his wife Ann and children.  The will was dated 7 October 1719, and administration was granted to his widow in 1720.  When Ann made her own will on 8 October 1734, she was of West Harn, County Essex.  Mentioned in her will were her son Ebenezer Adams and his wife Tabitha and their daughter Ann; son Timothy Adams; grandsons Richard and Samuel Adams, sons of her deceased son William; daughter Sarah Atkinson and son Timothy Atkinson.

(There seems to be no close kinship between Dr. John Adams and the two US presidents, John Adams and John Quincy Adams. Dr. Adams' family emigrated from Essex, in the southeast of England.  The two Adams presidents' forebears emigrated from Somerset, in the southwest of England.)

Richard and Ann's son Ebenezer Adams (John Adams' grandfather) came from England to St. Peter's Parish, New Kent County, Virginia, before 1714. In that year and subsequently, Ebenezer received grants of 3,983 acres of land in New Kent and Henrico counties.  In about 1718 Ebenezer married Tabitha Cocke, daughter of Richard Cocke the younger of "Brerno," Henrico County, by his first wife Anne, daughter of Thomas Bowler, Esq., of Rappahannock County.  Ebenezer was elected vestryman of St. Peter's Parish in 1718 and served in that capacity until his death on 24 April 1735.  In 1731 he became a captain in the colonial militia and was given the designation of gentleman.  He claimed an Adams coat of arms which consisted of an ermine and three cats passant in pale azure.

Ebenezer Adams and his wife Tabitha Cocke had eight children; those who survived all married.  Young Tabitha married Richard Eppes, a Burgess from Chesterfield County; Thomas married Elizabeth (Faantleroy) Cocke, widow of Thomas Adams' first cousin Col. Bowler Cocke; Anne became the second wife of Col. Francis Smith of Essex County; and Sarah married Col. John Fry, Burgess from Albemarle County and son of Joshua Fry.

Two of Ebenezer and Tabitha’s sons were named Richard, the first one dying in infancy, and the second being born in New Kent County on 17 May 1728.

Just when this second Richard Adams (John Adams' father) moved to Richmond, Virginia is uncertain, but he had served in the House of Burgesses from New Kent from 1752 until 1765, and in that body from Henrico County from 1769 until the end of the colonial period.

In 1774-75, Richard was a member of the Committee of Safety, and in 1775 was a member of the Virginia Convention.  From 1776 to 1778 Adams was a member of the Virginia House of Delegates, and from 1778 to 1782 was a member of the Virginia Senate. He was also a member of the committee charged with removing the seat of government from Williamsburg to Richmond in 1779.  He was said to be an ardent patriot and one of the most public spirited and influential citizens of Richmond.

By purchase and patent Richard Adams became the largest property owner in Richmond, and that by 1787 he was listed among the one hundred largest property holders in the state of Virginia.  His holdings included 10,865 acres of land in six counties, 108 slaves, 36 horses, 134 cattle, and two lots in Richmond.  Half of this land was in the newly created county of Henry on the North Carolina border.

In addition to his land holdings, Richard had other business and commercial interests.  His lumber business went up in flames caused by lightning in 1769. Only heroic measures by Adams and a friend prevented the fire from destroying the rest of the town.

Richard and his brother Thomas, four years his junior, were partners in a mercantile endeavor. While Thomas upheld the English end of the business from 1762 to 1774, Richard carried on the American end, which involved buying tobacco, securing outgoing cargo, and marketing incoming goods. Mrs. Griffith mentions “voluminous” Adams papers in the Virginia Historical Society which consist principally of business correspondence between the brothers.

Richard Adams offered property he owned on Richmond Hill to the state of Virginia for the erection of the State Capitol. The offer, a gift, was considered seriously but not accepted.

On 10 April 1755 Richard Adams married Elizabeth Griffin, daughter of Leroy and Mary Anne (Bertrand) Griffin of Richmond, and sister of Judge Cyrus Griffin of Williamsburg, a delegate to the Continental Congress in 1778, 1781, 1787, and president of the body in 1788.

Richard and Elizabeth Adams had eleven children, of whom one, Ebenezer, died in infancy, and of whom three, Tabitha, Elizabeth Griffin, and William died unmarried.  Thomas Bowler, the oldest son, married Sara Morrison.  Richard Jr., born 14 months after his brother, married first Mrs. Elizabeth (Southall) Randolph, and second Mrs. Sara Travers (Daniel) Hay.  Anne married Col. Mayo Carrington of "Boston Hill," Cumberland County.  Sarah married George William Smith, Governor of Virginia. Alice married William Marshall of Fauquier County, brother of Supreme Court Justice John Marshall. The tenth child of Richard and Elizabeth was John Adams.  The last-born child was Samuel Griffin Adams, whose sons, James Innes Adams and Thomas Adams, built homes on Mobile Bay at Montrose, Alabama.  (A street in that community still bears the name of Adams.) The home of James Innes Adams, a riverboat captain, still stands on Mobile Bay and is listed on the National Register of Historic Places.

In 1769 Richard Adams bought ten lots on the summit of the hill overlooking Richmond. He probably built a house on some of the property and about 1788 replaced it with another just south of the former dwelling. The house was said to be "unique architecturally in Richmond, with four chimneys, several dormers, and a shingled roof.”  When Richard Adams died in August 1800 and his wife Elizabeth died in December of the same year, their home was left to their son Richard, who survived all his children.  Upon the death of this second Richard, in 1817, his estate, estimated to be worth $1,200,000, was divided among his nieces and nephews.  After a few years the house passed out of the Adams family and eventually was acquired by the Sisters of the Academy of the Visitation of Monte Maria.  The nuns operated a school for some years and after its discontinuance, a dormitory for the nuns was erected on the site.

Richard Adams served as mayor of Richmond (its sixth) from December 11, 1786 to February 21, 1788. Richard died on August 2, 1800.

References

Further reading
 Adams, James Taylor, Adams Family Records, Wise, Virginia, 1929.
 Adams, Richard H., "Last Will and Testament," Will Book B.  pp. 108-112, Marengo County, Ala. Courthouse.
 Alabama 1860 Slave Schedule, Marengo County. Microfilm, Mobile Public Library,
Annals of Henrico Parish and History of St. John's P.E.
 Church, J. Staunton Moore, Ed., Richmond, VA., 1904.
 Duggar, Dr. Reuben Henry Duggar, "Note on Adams Family," in possession of Lew Toulmin, Silver Spring, MD.
 Gamble, Robert, "Endangered Aristocrats," Alabama Heritage, No. 23, Winter, 1992, pp. 26, 27.
 Assessment of Taxes on Real Estate, Marengo County, 1856.  Marengo County Courthouse.
Genealogies of Virginia Families, Vol. II, from the William & Mary College Quarterly Magazine, Baltimore: Genealogical Publishing Co., 1982.
Marriage Bonds of Henrico County, VA 1782-1853, Michael E. Pollock, ed., Genealogical Pub. Co., 1984.
Marriages of Some Virginia Residents 1607-1800, Dorothy Ford Wulbeck, ed., Gen. Pub. Co., 1986 reprint.
 Mead, Bishop William, Old Churches, Ministers and Families of Virginia, Vol. I, Philadelphia: Lippincott, 1987.
Records of the State Enumerations: 1782 to 1785, "First Census of the United States," Virginia.
Richmond Enquirer, June 28, 1825, page 3, death of John Adams; Oct. 20, 1809, page 4, death of Margaret Winston Adams.
 Scott, Florence and Richard, Montrose, 1959, reprint.  Montgomery, AL: Paragon, 1976.
 Scott, Mary Wingfield, Old Richmond Neighborhoods, Richmond, 1950.
 U.S. Census, Marengo County, Alabama, 1850, 1860.
 Van Liew, Willard Randolph, [Van Liew] Genealogical and Historical Record. Rev. & augmented by Emerio R. Van Liew. [Upper Montclair, N.J.] 1956.
Vestry Book and Register of St. Peter's Parish, New Kent and James City Counties 1684-1786. C.G. Chamberlayne, ed., Virginia State Library, 1937.
Virginia Colonial Abstracts, Beverley Fleet, abstracter, 1961.
Virginia Heraldica, William A. Crozier, ed., Gen. Pub. Co., 1965.
Vestry Book and Register of St. Peter's Parish. New Kent and James City Counties, Co., VA 1684-1786. Virginia State Library, Chamberlayne, editor, 1937, particularly regarding:
 Richard, son of Mr. Ebenezer Adams, deceased Sept. 12, 1721 (p.420).
 Elizabeth Griffin, daughter of Richard and Elizabeth Adams, born Dec. 17, 1757. (p. 557).
 Elizabeth, daughter of William Adams, born Jan. 26, 1719. (p.450).
 Bowler, son of Ebenezer Adams, born April 19, 1722 (p.450).
 William, son of Ebenezer Adams, Gent., born July 4, 1724 (p.450). 
 Richard, son of Ebenezer Adams Gent., born May 17, 1726 (p.451).
 George, son of Valentine Adams, born April 14, 1726 (p.451). 
 George Adams died Aug. 26, 1709 (p.419).
 Sally, daughter of George & Lucy Adams, born Feb. 23, 1758, baptized May 14, 1758 (p.558).
 Tabitha, daughter of Ebenezer Adams, Gent., born July 7, 1728 (p.452). 
 Major John Dandridge was chosen a vestryman to replace Capt. Ebenezer Adams, deceased, at the meeting Aug. 5, 1715. (p.241). 

Mayors of Richmond, Virginia
Members of the Virginia House of Delegates
Alumni of the University of Edinburgh Medical School

1773 births
1825 deaths
People from Virginia